The title of reader in the United Kingdom and some universities in the Commonwealth of Nations, for example India, Australia and New Zealand, denotes an appointment for a senior academic with a distinguished international reputation in research or scholarship.

In the traditional hierarchy of British and other Commonwealth universities, reader (and principal lecturer in the new universities) are academic ranks above senior lecturer and below professor, recognising a distinguished record of original research. Reader is similar to a professor without a chair, similar to the distinction between professor extraordinarius and professor ordinarius at some European universities, professor and chaired professor in Hong Kong and "professor name" (or associate professor) and chaired professor in Ireland. Readers and professors in the UK would correspond to full professors in the United States.

The promotion criteria applied to a readership in the United Kingdom are similar to those applied to a professorship: advancing from senior lecturer to reader generally requires evidence of a distinguished record of original research.

Several UK universities have dispensed with the reader grade, such as Oxford University, and the University of Leeds in 2012; those currently holding readerships retain the title, but no new readers will be appointed. In the few UK universities, including the University of Cambridge, that have adopted North American academic titles (i.e. lecturer is equivalent to assistant professor; senior lecturer equivalent to associate professor; professor equivalent to professor), readerships have become assimilated to professorships.

Denmark, Norway and Sweden 
In Denmark and Norway, docent was traditionally a title ranking between associate professor and professor, and was virtually identical to a readership in the United Kingdom, although today, the title is used somewhat differently. The traditional Danish/Norwegian docent title is widely translated as reader. Historically, there would often only be one professor (chair) for each institute or discipline, and other academics at the top academic level would be appointed as docents. In Norway all docents became full professors when the docent rank was abolished in 1985. 

In Sweden, and countries influenced by Sweden, docent is the highest academic title below that of (full) Professor, but it is usually not an academic position in itself, but is more like a degree; in this sense it is somewhat comparable to the Habilitation found in certain countries in Continental Europe. The Swedish docent title is translated as either reader or associate professor in the sense of a title above senior lecturer (i.e. associate professor as an alternative title of reader, as found in certain Commonwealth countries and Ireland).

Associate professor in place of reader 
At some universities in Commonwealth countries, such as India, Australia, New Zealand, South Africa and Malaysia, and in Ireland,  the title associate professor is used in place of reader, and similarly ranks above senior lecturer and below professor. This associate professor title should not be confused with the associate professor title used in the North American system; like the reader title it ranks higher than an associate professor in the North American system, as the North American associate professor corresponds to the senior lecturer rank in Commonwealth universities. About half as many people hold the full professor title in Commonwealth universities as compared to U.S. universities; hence the reader or associate professor rank in the Commonwealth system broadly corresponds to the lower half of the U.S. full professor rank.

Comparison
The table presents a broad overview of the traditional main systems, but there are universities which use a combination of those systems or other titles. Note that some universities in Commonwealth countries have adopted the American system in place of the Commonwealth system.

Notable examples
This rank was the highest academic rank reached by Alan Turing, Chaim Weizmann, Mary Cartwright and Anita Brookner.

References

Education and training occupations
Academic administration
Academic ranks